Morehead City Historic District is a national historic district located at Morehead City, Carteret County, North Carolina. It encompasses 123 contributing buildings in the oldest section of the town of Morehead City.  The buildings predominantly date from about 1900 to 1930, and include notable examples of Queen Anne and Colonial Revival style architecture.  Notable buildings include the Dudley House (1857), First Methodist Church (rebuilt 1952), Franklin Memorial Methodist Church (1923), the First Baptist Church (1920s), the First Freewill Baptist Church (1904, 1957), and the former Morehead City Public School (Charles S. Wallace Graded School, 1930).

It was listed on the National Register of Historic Places in 2003.

References

Historic districts on the National Register of Historic Places in North Carolina
Queen Anne architecture in North Carolina
Colonial Revival architecture in North Carolina
Buildings and structures in Carteret County, North Carolina
National Register of Historic Places in Carteret County, North Carolina